

John Rowe (1715–1787) was a property developer and merchant in 18th century Boston, Massachusetts. As a merchant, John Rowe's most famous cargo was the tea that played a starring role in the Boston Tea Party. As a developer, his name is remembered to this day in the name of Rowes Wharf, a modern development in downtown Boston on the site of his original wharf.

Biography
Rowe was born in Exeter, in the English county of Devon, but immigrated to Boston with his brothers at an early age. He married Hannah Speakman in 1743 and lived in Boston for the rest of his life. His diaries are kept by the Massachusetts Historical Society and include many valuable observations about people, events, and daily life in Boston. He held various posts in Boston, including serving on the Boston Board of Selectmen.

Rowe was evidently a very active smuggler, avoiding British trade regulations by trading with forbidden ports.  He was also an active slave dealer, shown by his advertisement in the 28 July 1746 edition of the Boston Evening Post.  In the ad, Rowe listed goods for auction at his wharf, such as cocoa and rum.  After the list of goods, he offered to purchase, "Some Negroes that can work at the Carpenter's Trade", and promised to "give a handsom[e] Price if he likes them." He joined protests against tightening restrictions of colonial trade, and helped incite the anti-Stamp Act riot in 1765 that destroyed Chief Justice Thomas Hutchinson's home.

Carl Becker mostly ignored John Rowe in The Eve of Revolution (1918), but he did include a letter written by Thomas Hutchinson.  In the letter, Hutchinson claimed that Rowe, Otis and Molineux and Davies provoked the protesters who destroyed Hutchinson's house on 26 August 1765: 
"When there is occasion to burn or hang effigies or pull down houses, these [rabble] are employed; but since government has been brought to a system, they are somewhat controlled by a superior set consisting of the mastermasons, and carpenters, &c., of the town of Boston. When anything of more importance is to be determined, as opening the custom-house on any matter of trade, these are under the direction of a committee of the merchants, Mr. Rowe at their head, then Molyneaux, Solomon Davies, et&,…this is proper for a general meeting of the inhabitants of Boston, where Otis, with his mob-high of eloquence, prevails in every motion… and it would be a very extraordinary resolve indeed that is not carried into execution". During the era of the American Revolution, Rowe avoided commitment to either side, and instead looked out after his business interests.

Rowe was the owner of one of the tea ships, the Eleanor, involved in the Boston Tea Party. According to some accounts, at the Old South Meeting House before the Tea Party, he uttered the famous words, "perhaps salt water and tea will mix tonight," but according to his own journal, he was unwell and was not present during the meeting or the Tea Party. Because several sources placed Rowe at the meeting, it's possible to theorise that the journal entry may have been an attempt to conceal his participation in the events leading to the Tea Party.

Rowe is most know for not having kids; however, he was a grandfather. Rowe had a brother by the name of Jacob Rowe who was also a Merchant by trade.

See also
 Rowes Wharf
 Little Bay Bridge, officially named for Rowe, between Dover and Newington, New Hampshire

References

Further reading
 Edward Pierce. Journal of John Rowe. Proceedings of the Massachusetts Historical Society, Second Series, Vol. 10, 1895; p. 11+.

Archives and records
John Rowe letter book at Baker Library Special Collections, Harvard Business School.

1715 births
1787 deaths
Colonial American merchants
Colonial American smugglers
American businesspeople in shipping
Businesspeople from Boston
18th-century American businesspeople
People of Massachusetts in the American Revolution
18th century in Boston
British emigrants to the United States
Members of the colonial Massachusetts House of Representatives